Woodside tram stop is a light rail stop situated between Woodside Green and Ashburton Park in the London Borough of Croydon in the southern suburbs of London. The stop is located on the site of the former Woodside railway station of the Woodside and South Croydon Railway; the old station buildings survive, though not used by Tramlink.

The tram stop has a platform on each side of the track with access to both platforms by stairs on the west side of the station building and by ramps on the east side.

Services
Woodside is served by tram services operated by Tramlink.

On Saturday evenings and Sundays, the service is reduced to a tram every 7-8 minutes in each direction, with trams every 15 minutes to Elmers End and Beckenham Junction.

Services are operated using Bombardier CR4000 and Stadler Variobahn Trams.

Connections
The stop is served by London Buses routes 130 and 312 which provide connections to New Addington, Addington Village, Croydon Town Centre and Thornton Heath.

Free interchange for journeys made within an hour is available between bus services and between buses and trams is available at Woodside as part of Transport for London's Hopper Fare.

See also 
Woodside railway station
Woodside and South Croydon Railway

References

External links  

Woodside tram Stop – Timetables and live departures at Transport for London
Woodside & South Croydon railway
Woodside tram stop on  The Trams website

Tramlink stops in the London Borough of Croydon
Railway stations in Great Britain opened in 2000